The Broad Front, previously named the Movement for Independence, Unity and Change, is a political formation in the Dominican Republic with a leftist-progressive platform. On the May 16th, 2006 parliamentary election it got 9,735 votes (0.32%), but no seats. In the municipal elections held simultaneously, the group had its best performance in Peralvillo (1,271 votes, 16.36%) and Bayaguana (1,274 votes, 10.27%). Virtudes Álvarez has been its leader for some time.

References

External links
Leftist Parties of the World, Dominican Republic. April 25, 2005.

1992 establishments in the Dominican Republic
Feminist organizations in the Dominican Republic
Feminist parties in North America
Political parties established in 1992
Political parties in the Dominican Republic
Progressive parties
Socialism in the Dominican Republic
Socialist parties in North America